Wave Books (established 2005) is an American independent press focusing on the publication of poetry, with a focus on innovative, contemporary poetry and poetry in translation. This independent publisher has published books by CAConrad, Don Mee Choi, Timothy Donnelly, Kate Durbin, Renee Gladman, Terrance Hayes, Tyehimba Jess, Douglas Kearney, Dorothea Lasky, Ben Lerner, Chelsey Minnis, Eileen Myles, Maggie Nelson, Hoa Nguyen, Mary Ruefle, Rachel Zucker, and others.

Wave Books Poetry Bus Tour 2006

Poetry Bus Tour was a literary event sponsored by Wave Books in 2006. It featured a tour of contemporary poets, traveling by a forty-foot Biodiesel bus, who stopped to perform in fifty North American cities over the course of fifty days.

Wave's Annual Poetry Festival 2011: Poetry in Translation
Wave Books presented three days of poetry in translation November 4–6, 2011, with the help of the Henry Art Gallery at the University of Washington. The event featured film screenings, art exhibitions, lectures, discussions and readings with featured poets and translators.

Recent publications
 Yi Sang: Selected Works edited by Don Mee Choi (translated by Choi, Jack Jung, Joyelle McSweeney, and Sawako Nakayasu), September 2020
 The Pedestrians by Rachel Zucker, April 2014
 If I Don't Breathe How Do I Sleep by Joe Wenderoth, April 2014
 Talkativeness by Michael Earl Craig, April 2014
 Language Arts by Cedar Sigo, April 2014
 Etruria by Rodney Koeneke, April 2014
 Poems (1962-1997) by Robert Lax, November 2013
 Soul in Space by Noelle Kocot, October 2013
 Trances of the Blast by Mary Ruefle, October 2013
 The Inside of an Apple by Joshua Beckman, September 2013
 People on Sunday by Geoffrey G. O'Brien, September 2013

References

External links
 Wave Books Website
 Poetry Bus Tour 2006
 Wave Books profiled in the Los Angeles Review of Books

Book publishing companies based in Seattle
Culture of Seattle
Small press publishing companies
Publishing companies established in 2005